Pommelsbrunn station is a railway station in the municipality of Pommelsbrunn, located in the Nürnberger Land district in Middle Franconia, Germany. It is located on the Nuremberg–Schwandorf line of Deutsche Bahn. It is served by the S1 of the Nuremberg S-Bahn.

References

Nuremberg S-Bahn stations
Railway stations in Bavaria
Railway stations in Germany opened in 2010
Buildings and structures in Nürnberger Land